Lee Tae-hoon or Lee Tae-hun may refer to:
 Lee Tae-hoon (footballer)
 Lee Tae-hoon (sailor)
 Lee Tae-hoon (baseball)
 Lee Tae-hoon (actor)